Mariano Vivanco (born 15 December 1975 in Lima, Peru) is a Peruvian fashion and portrait photographer.
He traveled the world with his family, who eventually settled down in New Zealand where his passion for photography took flight. Inspired by the likes of Steichen and Horst, Mariano moved to London in the year 2000 to pursue his career as a fashion photographer.

Vivanco has since become one of the world's leading editorial photographers, regularly shooting for Vogue, Harper's Bazaar, Muse Magazine, Dazed & Confused, Vogue Hommes Nippon, Numéro, Numéro Homme, i-D, DSection Magazine, Hercules, and GQ.

Often in black and white, his portraits, nudes, and editorial work (in both men's and womenswear) apply the principles of pure photography. Using simply light and shade, Vivanco renders visible the natural spirit of the sitter. His work has included actors, athletes, singers, and models. Cindy Crawford, Rihanna, Lady Gaga, Naomi Campbell, Eva Herzigova, Emma Watson, Ricky Martin, Lionel Messi, Eva Mendes, Miranda Kerr, Chloë Sevigny, Dita von Teese, Donatella Versace, Dolce & Gabbana, Sir Paul Smith, Cristiano Ronaldo, Lana Del Rey, Daniel Radcliffe, and Sam Smith (singer) among others have been his subjects.

Currently the National Portrait Gallery, London displays three of his works: a portrait of a young Lily Cole, model, one of stylist (and frequent collaborator with Vivanco) Nicola Formichetti, and one of choreographer Rafael Bonachela, (commissioned for i-D Magazine in 2004).

Vivanco is also seasoned in the medium of film. He began with experimental videos having his models mime to his favorite songs. These soon translated into spots for Dolce & Gabbana, Cesare Paciotti and Pull and Bear. He created a video piece for the Thierry Mugler menswear show in January 2011 featuring Rick Genest, known as "Zombie Boy".

After keeping up a prolific output, and at the same time gaining a large social media following, in 2013 Vivanco was named as one of the ‘500 Most Influential People In Fashion’ by the Business of Fashion.

Early life
Mariano Vivanco was born in Lima in 1975, and was raised around the world, including Peru, New Zealand, as well as the United States.

He moved to London in the year 2000. Vivanco got his start in the industry by making model portfolios, something he later turned into a book project, Ninety Five Chapel Market. Within a few years Vivanco was regularly shooting for magazines around the globe.

Career
Vivanco got his start in the fashion industry by shooting portraits of models in London. After numerous shoots and gaining notice in the London fashion scene, he began to work more often for Dazed & Confused. In 2001, while working for Dazed & Confused, Vivanco met stylist Nicola Formichetti with whom he worked shooting several covers for the highly esteemed British magazine.

Vivanco has also published several books for the Dolce & Gabbana label: Calcio (2003), which was the first book of its kind to capture the emergence of the soccer superstar, Milan (2004), Nationale (2006) and Milan Family (2007). The 2011 publication Uomini has received international recognition. David Gandy by Dolce & Gabbana (a 2011 publication) reveals an intimate portrait of male model David Gandy's career and his close relationship with the fashion house Dolce & Gabbana (June 2011).

In 2006, he was asked to shoot the French rugby team for the Dieux Du Stade Calendar for 2007.

In 2007, Vivanco held his debut solo exhibition at the Print Space Gallery in east London, supported by Dazed & Confused. Here, he exhibited two innovative editorial stories produced for Dazed entitled Cult and Artist. His second exhibition followed quickly, this time in Milan's Gold Restaurant. Here, he exhibited his images of the model David Gandy for Dolce & Gabbana's 2008 calendar, which fused the classical ideal of Michelangelo's David with modern ideals of masculinity.

Later, in 2008, Vivanco published Ninety Five Chapel Market. A retrospective look at his first years in London, documenting Sienna Miller, David Gandy, and Lily Cole to name a few, at the start of their careers. The collection, named after his first London address, not only shows those early images and previewed the graphic style that would ultimately become his signature.

In the fall of 2011, Vivanco photographed Emma Watson for i-D magazine No.314. He shot model David Gandy for the Dolce & Gabbana Fall/Winter 11/12 Eyewear Campaign as well as the cover and fashion editorial photoshoot for Attitude. Vivanco also photographed Rick Genest for the Thierry Mugler French fashion house revival in 2011. Vivanco, teamed with Nicola Formichetti and Lady Gaga produced a viral video titled "Anatomy of Change," featuring a remix of Lady Gaga's song "Scheiße." Later that year, Vivanco shot the pop chart-topping and fashion icon Lady Gaga for the British i-D magazine's Exhibitionist issue, featuring clothing from the Thierry Mugler fashion house.

In December 2012, Vivanco’s "Personal Project" was released,  showcasing new nude work, accompanied by a short film which he also directed. In the book’s Foreword, stylist and fashion designer Nicola Formichetti writes: “He has the ability to strip a person down to their essence, allowing the sitter to speak and to flourish, whether they are dressed or undressed.[...] I often refer to Mariano’s work as timeless, like a Renaissance painting, a Classic movie or sometimes a chaotic Opera.”

Songstress Lana Del Rey also found herself in front of Vivanco’s lens for both British GQ  - who declared her ‘Woman of the Year 2012, and in Numero Tokyo.

In 2013, Vivanco photographed a historic collaboration with British artist Damien Hirst and Rihanna for the 25th Anniversary of British GQ. He shows Rihanna reconfigured into a modern Medusa, complete with live serpents - pythons - twisting around her body. The images were released to the shock and acclaim typical of Hirst’s oeuvre, with the press describing them “as scary as they are beautiful.”  Crowning 2013 was Vivanco’s inclusion one of the ‘500 Most Influential People In Fashion’ by the Business of Fashion.

2014 included more work with Rihanna, Victoria’s Secret Angel Candice Swanepoel and other top models for Vogue Brazil. Vivanco also captured the cover of British GQ with his shot of a sharp-suited Colin Firth.

2015 saw Vivanco work with rock-heiress Georgia May Jagger for numerous campaigns for eyewear giant Sunglass Hut, and shoot various other campaigns, including images for Cesare Paciotti and Joop.

In 2016 Vivanco began a relationship with Bernheimer Gallery showing as a fine artist in Paris Photo, Munich Highlights, Art Geneve, and Masterpiece London. Top Model Karlie Kloss graced one of his numerous Vogue Russia spreads and covers. Next, Paris’s sexy Lui magazine called, and the sexy forms of Jasmine Sanders aka Golden Barbie, put his long experience in shooting nudes to good use.

Industry bible WWD wrote about the release of his new photography book,  Portraits Nudes Flowers (2016) in their Fashion Scoops and the retrospective collection of 15 years of work from early explorations to polished portraits was described as ‘an aria in monochrome’ by website Fucking Young.

Early 2017 saw another ground-breaking collaboration with Rihanna, this time for the March issue of Harper’s Bazaar USA. Rihanna takes on the stylish mantle of aviatrix Amelia Earhart, and the subscriber’s cover features the star strapped onto a vintage airplane at several thousand feet above the Santa Paula airport in California. Vivanco captured the image from the door-less plane flying alongside.

The April 2017 cover of British GQ features Vivanco’s photographs of heavy weight boxing champion Anthony Joshua.

References

External links
 Official Website
 Blog
 Models.com
 "Mariano Vivanco: A Portrait Of An Imagemaker by Lope Navo"
 PowerGrid
 Uomini
 Exclusive Interview At Bloginity
 La Lettre De La Photographie Interview
 Models.com Interview
 Seelikeme.com Interview
 Stylelist.com Interview
 Ftape.com Daphne Groeneveld Muse Cover
 Fashiongonerogue.com Daphne Groeneveld Muse Shoot
 Karlismyunkle.com Lana Del Rey GQ Uk Cover

1975 births
Peruvian emigrants to the United Kingdom
Fashion photographers
Living people